Qeshlaq-e Qanbarlu Rostam Qanbarlui-ye Vosta (also Romanized as Qeshlāq-e Qanbarlū Rostam Qanbarlūī-ye Vosţá) is a village in Qeshlaq-e Gharbi Rural District, Aslan Duz District, Parsabad County, Ardabil Province, Iran. At the 2006 census, its population was 422, in 59 families.

References 

Towns and villages in Parsabad County